, also known as "Saga Park Station"
 is a passenger railway station located in the town of Kuroshio, Hata District, Kōchi Prefecture, Japan.It is operated by the Tosa Kuroshio Railway and has the station number "TK31".

Lines and services
Only local trains stop at the station.

Layout
The station consists of a side platform serving a single track on a high embankment overlooking the adjacent main road. A flight of steps leads up to the platform. A wheelchair ramp is also provided. There is no station building, only a concrete shelter for waiting passengers.

Adjacent stations

|-
!colspan=5|Tosa Kuroshio Railway

Surrounding area
 Japan National Route 56 runs next to the station.
The Western part of the Tosa Southwest Large Scale Park Saga section (土佐西南大規模公園) is across the main road from the station exit.

See also
 List of Railway Stations in Japan

References

External links

Railway stations in Kōchi Prefecture
Railway stations in Japan opened in 1993
Kuroshio, Kōchi